Fusionidae is a family of the superfamily Fusionicae in the phylum Apicomplexa

Taxonomy

There is one genus - Fusiona - in this family.

History

This family was created in 1965 by Stejskal.

Description

Species in this family are homoxenous.

Gametocytes - not described

Spores - not described

Both gamonts and trophozoites are septate. The gamonts are morphologically different (anisogamous).

Sexual reproduction involves a cephalocaudal association. During syzygy the nucleus and entrocyte of the satellite move to the primite where they fuse.

References

Apicomplexa families